Miss Indonesia 2005 was the first Miss Indonesia contest. The final night was held on  Balai Sarbini, Jakarta. This contest is won by Imelda Fransisca (West Java). She had represented Indonesia in Miss ASEAN 2005.

References

Miss Indonesia